Islatravir (4′-ethynyl-2-fluoro-2′-deoxyadenosine, EFdA, or MK-8591) is an investigational drug for the treatment of HIV infection.  It is classified as a nucleoside reverse transcriptase translocation inhibitor (NRTTI). Merck is developing a subdermal drug-eluting implant to administer islatravir.

Biological activity
Islatravir has activity against HIV in animal models, and is being studied clinically for HIV treatment and prophylaxis. Islatravir is a nucleoside analog reverse transcriptase translocation inhibitor that unlike other such inhibitors, inhibits HIV through multiple mechanisms, providing rapid suppression of the virus, when tested in macaques and mice. Nevertheless, there are HIV strains resistant to islatravir and research is ongoing.

References

Nucleoside analog reverse transcriptase inhibitors
Ethynyl compounds
Fluoroarenes
Hydroxymethyl compounds